Castle Ditches is the site of an Iron Age trivallate hillfort in the southeast of Tisbury parish in Wiltshire, England.

It is probable that its ancient name was Spelsbury; it was referred to as Willburge in Tisbury's charter of 984 A.D. Its shape is roughly triangular, and follows the contours of the small hill upon which it sits. The earthworks comprise a triple row of ramparts and ditches, now covered on three sides by woodland. There is a large entrance towards the southeast, where there is the shallowest incline of the hill; but there is also a narrow slit on the opposite side.

Castle Ditches was recorded as a Scheduled Monument in 1932.

Location
The hill has a summit of 193m AOD and overlooks the valley of the River Nadder to the north. Public footpaths surround the site, but the land is privately owned.

See also 
List of hill forts in England

References



Iron Age sites in England
Hill forts in Wiltshire
Archaeological sites in Wiltshire
Scheduled monuments in Wiltshire